Aarhus Botanical Gardens is a botanical garden in Aarhus, Denmark. It is located north of the Old Town open-air village museum and was founded in 1875.

The park was originally created primarily as a botanical and academic study-ground in relation to Aarhus University and provides an attraction of interest to those who wish to inspect the thousands of plant species on display here. All are labelled in both Latin and Danish. The landscape is quite varied and includes a large greenhouse center; originally from 1970 by C. F. Møller Architects, but with a newly added tropical hothouse. The gardens have an open-air amphitheatre, two small ponds, a children's playground and the large lawns are popular with picnics, gatherings and events of all kinds year round.

The greenhouses has been heavily renovated from 2011 to late 2014 and a large tropical dome was added, amongst other facilities. The project was budgeted at 65 million DKK and realized in a cooperation between Aarhus Municipality, Aarhus University and Realdania, with C. F. Møller Architects as architectural designers.

Budget cuts, change of status and the future 
Aarhus municipality have found large parts of the botanical gardens too expensive in upkeep and manpower for several years. It was decided to stop the upkeep of the large rose gardens and the arboretum at one point and thereby end the park's status as a botanical garden, but civil protests postponed the city councils decisions for some years. In 2011, a group of citizens founded the non-governmental organization "Botanisk Haves Venner" (Friends of the Botanical Gardens) and since 2012, they are now in charge of the daily chores of maintaining the rose gardens and arboretum, working for free. Aarhus University also took over part of the responsibility from Aarhus Municipality, through the Science Museums which operates the greenhouses.

The gardens (including the greenhouses) are changing its status and function from a scientific study ground to a place for recreational activities, public outreach and education.

Gallery 
Facilities

From the park

References

Sources 
 Sustainable Hothouse Architectural company C.F. Møller 
 Aarhus Botanical Gardens Aarhus Municipality 
 Success with volunteers maintaining beds in The Botanical Garden Aarhus Municipality (2013)

External links

 The Greenhouses Steno museum (Aarhus university)
 Friends of The Botanical Garden The associations own homepage

1875 establishments in Denmark
Botanical gardens in Denmark
Parks in Aarhus
Tourist attractions in Aarhus
Botanical Gardens